The Court of Claims in the United Kingdom is a special court established after the accession of a new sovereign to judge the validity of the claims of persons to perform certain honorary services at the coronation.

The first recorded such court was held in 1377 before the lord high steward. Since the time of Henry VII, commissioners have been appointed in lieu, and the court now consists of a royal commission appointed under the Great Seal.

The court may refer any claim to the sovereign's pleasure, and the sovereign may withdraw a claim from the commission and transfer it to another tribunal.

For the 2023 coronation of Charles III and Camilla, a Coronation Claims Office within the Cabinet Office has been established instead of the court.

References

Further reading 
Coronation of Her Majesty Queen Elizabeth the Second : minutes of the proceedings of the Court of claims (Crown Office, 1952)
Coronation Claims, Gerald Wollaston (London, 1910)

External links
 — Court of Claims 1910
 — Court of Claims 1936

British royalty
Courts of the United Kingdom
Constitution of the United Kingdom